Reisig is a surname. Notable people with the surname include:

Christian Karl Reisig (1792–1829), German philologist and linguist
Darren Reisig (born 1968), Canadian lacrosse player
Robin Reisig, American journalist and journalism professor
Ruben Reisig (born 1996), German-Ghanaian footballer